C83 may refer to:

Byron Airport, a public airport serving Contra Costa County, California, USA.
 Corydoras loxozonus, a freshwater catfish.
 Ruy Lopez chess openings ECO code
 Diffuse non-Hodgkin's lymphoma ICD-10 code
 HMS Southampton (C83), a 1934 British Royal Navy cruiser
 Labour Standards (Non-Metropolitan Territories) Convention, 1947 code
 Caldwell 83 (NGC 4945), a spiral galaxy in the constellation Centaurus

C-83 may refer to :
 C-83 Coupe, an aircraft